The canton of Valbonne is an administrative division of the Alpes-Maritimes department, southeastern France. It was created at the French canton reorganisation which came into effect in March 2015. Its seat is in Valbonne.

It consists of the following communes:

Antibes (partly)
Le Bar-sur-Loup
Caussols
Châteauneuf-Grasse
Cipières
Courmes
Gourdon
Gréolières
Opio
Le Rouret
Tourrettes-sur-Loup
Valbonne

References

Cantons of Alpes-Maritimes